Henry George Lamond  (13 June 1885 – 12 July 1969) was an Australian farmer and writer, notable for his novels about the land, people and animals of outback Queensland.  In addition to his fiction and non-fiction books, he wrote over 900 essays and articles for magazines including Walkabout.  At one point in his career he was considered to be the Australian 'Thompson Seton'.  

Lamond was born at Carl Creek in Queensland's Gulf Country and educated at Brisbane Grammar School and the Queensland Agricultural College, Gatton.  He was the son of later police inspector James Lamond.  

From 1902 to 1927 he worked at jobs ranging from jackaroo to horse-breaker to manager on various properties in western Queensland. The couple had a daughter and two sons (one of whom, Hal, was killed in 1942 while serving with the Royal Australian Air Force).  

From 1927 to 1937 he leased the Molle Islands in the Whitsunday Group near Proserpine, Queensland, farmed on South Molle Island and established a mail service to the mainland.  In 1937 he moved to a farm at Lindum, Brisbane.  He had been writing short stories and magazine articles since the 1920s, but from the 1930s he was increasingly supporting himself and his family through his writing.  His work was popular not only in Australia but also in Britain and the United States. 

By 1949 Lamond was living at Annerley, Brisbane.  He was awarded a Member of the British Empire in 1968.  Lamond died in Brisbane, surviving his wife by a year, and was cremated.

Bibliography

Books written by Lamond include:
 1931 – Horns and Hooves: handling stock in Australia. Country Life: London.
 1934 – An Aviary on the Plains. Angus & Robertson: Sydney.
 1934 – Tooth and Talon: tales of the Australian wild. Angus & Robertson: Sydney.
 1937 – Amathea: the story of a horse. Angus & Robertson: Sydney.
 1943 – Kilgour's Mare. W. Morrow & Co: New York.
 1943 – Grand old man of the pastoral industry.  The story of pastoralist William Ross Munro.  
 1945 – Dingo: the story of an outlaw. W. Morrow & Co: New York.
 1946 – Brindle Royalist: a story of the Australian plains. W. Morrow & Co: New York.
 1949 – White Ears the Outlaw: the Story of a Dingo. Angus & Robertson: Sydney.  Originally a newspaper serial in April 1934.
 1953 – Kangaroo. J. Day Co: New York.
 1953 – Big Red. Sun Books: Melbourne.
 1954 – The Manx Star: a story of the Australian plains. Faber & Faber: London.
 1955 – Towser. The Sheep Dog. Faber & Faber: London.
 1958 – The Red Ruin Mare. Faber & Faber: London.
 1959 – Sheep Station. Faber & Faber: London.
 1966 – Etiquette of Battle. Lansdowne Press: Melbourne.

References

20th-century Australian novelists
Australian male novelists
Australian male short story writers
1885 births
1969 deaths
20th-century Australian non-fiction writers
20th-century Australian short story writers
20th-century Australian male writers